This article gives the summarized final standings of each FIVB Volleyball World League tournament, an annual competition involving national men's volleyball teams. The most successful teams, have been: Brazil, 9 times (1993, 2001, 2003–07, 2009–10) and Italy, 8 times (1990–92, 1994–95, 1997, 1999–2000). The competition has been won 3 times by Russia (2002, 2011, 2013), twice by United States (2008, 2014) and France (2015, 2017) and once by Netherlands (1996), Cuba (1998), Poland (2012) and Serbia (2016).

Summary I

1st - Champions
2nd - Runners-up
3rd - Third place
 -  – Did not enter / Did not qualify
   – Hosts

Summary II
After 2017 World League
 Qualifications are not included

Notes

External links
Honours (1990–2016)

Statistics
Volleyball records and statistics